The Third Federal Electoral District of Coahuila (III Distrito Electoral Federal de Coahuila) is one of the 300 Electoral Districts into which Mexico is divided for the purpose of elections to the federal Chamber of Deputies and one of seven such districts in the state of Coahuila.

It elects one deputy to the lower house of Congress for each three-year legislative period, by means of the first past the post system.

District territory
Under the 2005 districting scheme, Coahuila's Second District is located in the central-eastern portion of the state and
covers the municipalities of Abasolo, Arteaga, Candela, Castaños, Escobedo, General Cepeda, Juárez, Monclova, Progreso, Ramos Arizpe, Sabinas and Sacramento.

The district's head town (cabecera distrital), where results from individual polling stations are gathered together and collated, is the city  of Monclova.

Deputies returned to Congress from this district

 1943–1946: Raúl López Sánchez (PRM)
L Legislature
 1976–1979: Fernando Cabrera Rodríguez (PRI)
LI Legislature
 1979–1982:
LII Legislature
 1982–1985:
LIII Legislature
 1985–1988:
LIV Legislature
 1988–1991:
LV Legislature
 1991–1994: Fidel Hernández Puente (PRI)
LVI Legislature
 1994–1997: Miguel Ángel García García (PRI)
LVII Legislature
 1997–2000: Martha Laura Carranza Aguayo (PRI)
LVIII Legislature
 2000–2003: Oscar Maldonado Domínguez (PAN)
LIX Legislature
 2003–2006: Ricardo Rodríguez Rocha (PRI)
LX Legislature
 2006–2009: Rolando Rivero Rivero (PAN)

References

Federal electoral districts of Mexico
Federal Electoral District 03
Federal Electoral District 03